The Van Cleve Opera House was an opera house located in Hartford City, Indiana in the United States. It opened in 1882. As of 1884 it was claimed to be able to seat 700 people, but in 1902 it was seating 450 patrons. The opera house featured minstrel works, including around 1902, when "Mr. Mikado" by Frank Dumont was performed. The opera house also hosted academic lectures.

References

Buildings and structures in Blackford County, Indiana
1882 establishments in Indiana
Opera houses in Indiana
Theatres in Indiana
Defunct companies based in Indiana
Theatres completed in 1882
Music venues completed in 1882